Edmundo Gómez Moreno (born 17 February 1991), better known by his stage name Raymix, is a Mexican musician and aerospace engineer. Nicknamed El Rey de la Electrocumbia ("The King of Electrocumbia"), Raymix started his music career in the early 2010s, when he joined a trance project called Light & Wave with two other Mexican musicians. Their song "Feeling the City" was featured on the Armin van Buuren radio show A State of Trance. In 2013, Raymix was invited to work in a NASA educative internship, where he helped to develop a satellite. 

Around 2015, Raymix gained popularity thanks to the song "Oye Mujer", a  track among tianguis sellers, sonideros, and illegal music distributors. Raymix signed with Universal Music Latin Entertainment and in 2018 he released his debut album Oye Mujer. The song topped the Billboard Regional Mexican Airplay and Tropical Airplay charts. Additionally, it reached number 6 on the Bubbling Under Hot 100 chart and has been certified  (Latin) by the Recording Industry Association of America (RIAA) and Diamond + 2× Platinum by the Asociación Mexicana de Productores de Fonogramas y Videogramas (AMPROFON).

Early life and career
Edmundo Gómez Moreno was born on 17 February 1991, in San José El Vidrio, a community located in Nicolás Romero, State of Mexico. Multiple members of his family are musicians, including his grandfather, his cousin, and his father is a grupero musician. When he was a child, Gómez learned to play the keyboard, and his father taught him Los Tigres del Norte songs. Additionally, he learned singing and to play the drum kit, the guitar and the organ at a church.

On his 18th birthday, Gómez was given a MIDI controller, with which he started to compose trance songs. Between 2011 and 2012, Gómez joined two other Mexican musicians and they created Light & Wave. Their song "Feeling the City" was featured on two episodes of Armin van Buuren's radio show A State of Trance. Around this time, Gómez was studying aerospace engineering at the Instituto Politécnico Nacional, in Mexico City, for a space systems degree. In 2013, Gómez joined a NASA education internship, where he helped to develop an education satellite. During his time there, he listened to cumbias and, in 2014, he composed "Oye Mujer". According to Raymix, Alberto Pedraza (composer of "Guaracha sabrosona") borrowed him his loudspeakers, and with two cellphones and 3,000 pesos he recorded a music video for the song. In 2015, Gómez was unable to get a job in the US despite his academic accomplishments and qualifications.

2015–2019: Breakthrough and Oye Mujer

"Oye Mujer" became popular among sonideros and was illegally distributed in tianguis markets. In 2016, Raymix went on his debut tour in the United States. While Sony Music Latin, Warner Music Latina and Universal Music Latin Entertainment contacted him, Raymix ended up signing with Universal Music. His debut album, Oye Mujer, was released on 16 February 2018. The album peaked at 3 on the Billboard Regional Mexican Albums chart, 7 on the Heatseekers Albums chart, and at 9 on the Tropical Albums chart. On 25 February 2020, the Recording Industry Association of America (RIAA) certified Oye Mujer  (Latin). In Mexico, the album was certified Platinum by the Asociación Mexicana de Productores de Fonogramas y Videogramas (AMPROFON).

In April 2018, a remixed version of "Oye Mujer" was released as duet with Colombian singer Juanes. In the United States, "Oye Mujer" topped the Billboard Tropical Airplay and the Regional Mexican Airplay charts, where it stayed for 11 consecutive weeks on the former chart. "Oye Mujer" ended the year as the most-performed song on both charts. It also charted at 7 on the Hot Latin Songs, and 6 on the Bubbling Under Hot 100. In Mexico, the song it peaked atop the Top 20 chart, and it reached number 9 on the Airplay chart. On 25 February 2020, the RIAA certified "Oye Mujer"  (Latin).

"Dónde Estarás" was released as the follow-up single in March 2018. It charted at 3 on the Billboard Regional Mexican Airplay, and at 28 on the Hot Latin Songs. On 25 February 2020, the RIAA certified "Dónde Estarás"  (Latin). Other releases off Oye Mujer include "Perdóname", "Ángel Malvado", and "Primer Beso"; all of them received an AMPROFON certification. "Oye Mujer" became the 99th most-listened song of 2017 in Mexico. The remix of "Oye Mujer" and "Dónde Estarás" became the 12nd and 33th most-played songs of 2018 in Mexico, respectively.

2019–present: Fake Lover and non-album singles
In 2019, Raymix released his extended play (EP) Fake Lover. "Tú Eres la Razón (Electrocumbia Remake)", originally by la Arrolladora Banda El Limón, was launched as the lead single on 29 March. Raymix joined Georgel, Esteman, Celso Piña and Mexican Institute of Sound (MIS) with a remix of Juan Gabriel's "El Noa Noa", released on 11 October 2019. "Te Fuiste" was published as the second single off the EP on 30 October. In March 2020, Raymix joined with Mexican pop singer Paulina Rubio in the song "Tú y Yo", In the US, it reached number 3 on the Tropical Airplay chart, 16 on the Regional Mexican Airplay chart, and number 39 on the Latin Airplay chart. In Mexico, it peaked atop the Mexico Top 20 chart, the Mexico Popular Airplay chart, and the Mexico Airplay chart.

In May 2020 Raymix released the song "Olvídame Tú" as a duet with Mexican sonidero ICC. In June, he worked with Karla Vallín in "Te Quito la Pena". The next month, he collaborated with Juan Solo in "Masoquista". In early August 2020, he co-published the song "Y Se Dio" with the Spanish musician Juan Magán. By the end of the month, the single "Llámame" was launched, which Raymix described as an autobiographical song as it tells the story of his first relationship and how it ended. The music video was directed by his brother and the song peaked at number 3 on the Tropical Airplay chart. On 9 October 2020, Raymix released a remix of Esteman's song "Solo". Two days later, during the National Coming Out Day, he performed at the OutMusik Fest, a festival featuring multiple LGBT musicians and their allies. In December of the same year,  he remixed "Prisionero" by Chilean singer Gepe; the result was titled "Prisionero (De la Cumbia)" and had a record production by MIS.

Music style and stage name
Raymix defines his music style as a mixture of electronic music subgenres (trance, house, chill-out, and ambient) with cumbia, which he calls "electrocumbia". His stage name is a combination of a nickname, "Ray", and "Mix" because of his interest in electronic music. A friend of his coined it while at college. Raymix is also known as "El Rey de la Electrocumbia" (Spanish for "The King of Electrocumbia").

Personal life
On 5 June 2020, Raymix released a video where he came out as gay, saying "Today I am freer, happier than ever because now I know that I can express myself as I really am", and added that some acquaintances advised him to not do so because they consider that people are not prepared for a gay regional or cumbia musician. After the publication of "Llámame", Raymix commented that he was young when he had his first relationship, but the other party was not interested in a serious relationship. After their , he came out to his dad. Raymix also said he wrote the song because he wanted to base his career on his truth.

Discography

 Oye Mujer (2018)
 Te Voy a Conquistar (2022)

Awards
In 2018, Raymix was nominated at the 4th Annual Latin American Music Awards for New Artist of the Year and Favorite Regional Mexican Song for "Oye Mujer", winning the latter. In 2019, Raymix was nominated at the 31st Lo Nuestro Awards for Revelation Artist of the Year, Regional Mexican Male Artist of the Year and Regional Mexican Song of the Year for "Oye Mujer". He was nominated at the 6th iHeartRadio Music Awards for Best New Latin Artist. At the 26th Billboard Latin Music Awards Raymix won Regional Mexican Song of the Year, and was nominated to New Artist of the Year, Regional Mexican Artist of the Year and Regional Mexican Album of the Year for Oye Mujer. He won Favorite Regional Mexican Album at the 5th Annual Latin American Music Awards for Oye Mujer. In 2020, Raymix was nominated at the 32nd Lo Nuestro Awards for Regional Mexican Artist of the Year and Video of the Year for "Tú Eres la Razón (Electrocumbia Remake)". In 2021, along with Paulina Rubio, Raymix was nominated for Regional Mexican Cumbia Song of the Year for "Tú y Yo" at the 33rd Lo Nuestro Awards. In 2022, he was nominated for Regional Mexican Cumbia Song of the Year for "Llámame" at the 34th Lo Nuestro Awards.

References

Cumbia musicians
Electronic musicians
Instituto Politécnico Nacional alumni
Mexican gay musicians
Mexican engineers
Musicians from the State of Mexico
Trance musicians
Universal Music Group artists
LGBT people in Latin music
Universal Music Latin Entertainment artists
1991 births
Living people